This is a list of oldest and youngest Academy Award winners and nominees in the award categories Acting and Directing.

This list is based on "statistics valid through the nomination announcement for the 2015 (88th Academy Awards), announced on January 14, 2016", as documented in The Official Academy Awards Database.

At the 90th Academy Awards, James Ivory became the oldest-ever Oscar winner in any category, at age 89, after receiving the award for Best Adapted Screenplay for his work on Call Me by Your Name.

At the 95th Academy Awards, John Williams became the oldest Oscar nominee in any category, at age 90, after receiving his 53rd Oscar nomination for Best Original Score for his work on The Fabelmans.

There are only three people in Oscar history who have won two Oscars by the age of 30 or younger:
  Luise Rainer for The Great Ziegfeld and The Good Earth 
 Jodie Foster for The Accused and The Silence of the Lambs
 Hilary Swank for Boys Don't Cry and Million Dollar Babyall in the Best Actress in a Leading Role category.

Superlatives 
Among the oldest and youngest winners and nominees of Academy Awards in standard competitive categories, the following superlatives emerge:

Best Director

Oldest winners 
Source: "Academy Award Statistics: Directing: Oldest/Youngest Directing Nominees/Winners: AMPAS Awards Database

Oldest nominees

Youngest winners

Youngest nominees

Best Actor in a Leading Role 
Source: "Academy Award Statistics: Acting: Oldest/Youngest Winners and Nominees for Acting, By Category: Actor [in a Leading Role]", AMPAS Awards Database

Oldest winners

Oldest nominees

Youngest winners

Youngest nominees

Best Actress in a Leading Role 
Source: "Academy Award Statistics: Acting: Oldest/Youngest Winners and Nominees for Acting, By Category: Actress [in a Leading Role]", AMPAS Awards Database

Oldest winners

Oldest nominees

Youngest winners

Youngest nominees

Best Actor in a Supporting Role 
Source: "Academy Award Statistics: Acting: Oldest/Youngest Winners and Nominees for Acting, By Category: Actor [in a Supporting Role]", AMPAS Awards Database

Oldest winners

Oldest nominees

Youngest winners

Youngest nominees

Best Actress in a Supporting Role 
Source: "Academy Award Statistics: Acting: Oldest/Youngest Winners and Nominees for Acting, By Category: Actress [in a Supporting Role]", AMPAS Awards Database

Oldest winners

Oldest nominees

Youngest winners

Youngest nominees

Honorary Awards 
Source: "Academy Award Statistics: Acting: Oldest/Youngest Winners and Nominees for Acting, By Category: Acting Honorary Award Winners", AMPAS Awards Database

Academy Honorary Award

Oldest honorees

Oldest acting honorees

Honorary Juvenile Award

Youngest honorees

See also 

 Academy Award
 Academy Juvenile Award
 Academy of Motion Picture Arts and Sciences (AMPAS)
 List of posthumous Academy Award winners and nominees
 List of superlative Academy Award winners and nominees

References

External links 
 "Academy Award Statistics" – Index ("Statistics Menu") published in The Official Academy Awards Database (Awards Database), on the official AMPAS website. ("Statistics are arranged by award category and represent eighty years of Academy Awards history through the 80th Academy Awards, presented on February 24, 2008." [Documents for "Directing" and "Acting" both last updated March 2008.])
 Academy of Motion Picture Arts and Sciences (AMPAS) – Official website.

Lists of Academy Award winners
Lists of oldest people
Film-related lists of superlatives
Lists of the youngest people
United States-related lists of superlatives